Georg Kießling (7 March 1903 – 24 June 1964) was a German international footballer.

References

Germany-footy-forward-1900s-stub

1903 births
1964 deaths
Association football forwards
German footballers
Germany international footballers